Johnny Shuggie Otis (born Johnny Alexander Veliotes, Jr.; November 30, 1953) is an American singer-songwriter, recording artist, and multi-instrumentalist.

Otis's composition "Strawberry Letter 23" as recorded by The Brothers Johnson topped the Billboard R&B chart and reached #5 of the Billboard Hot 100 chart in 1977. He achieved commercial success with his 1974 single "Inspiration Information" (from the album of the same title), reaching #56 on the R&B chart.

Biography
Born in Los Angeles, California, Otis is the son of rhythm and blues musician, bandleader, and impresario Johnny Otis, who was of Greek descent, and his wife Phyllis Walker, who was of African American and Filipino descent. The name "Shuggie" (short for "sugar", according to his mother) was coined by Phyllis when he was a newborn. Otis began playing guitar when he was two years old and performing professionally with his father's band at the age of eleven, often disguising himself with dark glasses and a false mustache so that he could play with his father's band in after-hours nightclubs.

Otis is primarily known as a guitarist and also sings and plays a multitude of other instruments. While growing up with and being heavily influenced by many blues, jazz and R&B musicians in his father immediate circle, Otis began to gravitate towards the popular music of his generation such as Jimi Hendrix, Arthur Lee (of the band Love), and Sly Stone. In 1969, Al Kooper asked Otis to be the featured guest on the second installment (Kooper Session) of the Super Session album series that had previously included Stephen Stills and Mike Bloomfield. Kooper and the then-fifteen-year-old Otis recorded the whole album over one weekend in New York. After returning to Los Angeles, Otis, along with his father and singer Delmar "Mighty Mouth" Evans, performed on the album Cold Shot (by the elder Otis), released in 1969 on the Los Angeles-based Kent label. Another obscure album this three-man team recorded was the extremely rare and risque Snatch & The Poontangs, on which Otis recorded tracks under the pseudonym "Prince Wunnerful".

Otis released his first solo album later that year entitled Here Comes Shuggie Otis on Epic Records. Guest musicians on his debut included Johnny, Leon Haywood, Al McKibbon, Wilton Felder. This further established his reputation and catapulted him to the attention of B. B. King, who was quoted in a 1970 issue of Guitar Player magazine saying Otis was his "favorite new guitarist". Some of the artists Otis performed and recorded with during that time include Frank Zappa (having played electric bass on the legendary instrumental, "Peaches en Regalia" from the 1969 album Hot Rats), Etta James, Eddie Vinson, Richard Berry, Louis Jordan, and Bobby 'Blue' Bland, among many others.

The album Otis received the most recognition for was his second Epic Records release in 1971, Freedom Flight, which featured his hit "Strawberry Letter 23". Both the album and single reached the Billboard Top 200 and the Billboard Hot 100, respectively and caught the attention of Brothers Johnson guitarist George Johnson, who then played it for producer Quincy Jones. They covered the song and it became a hit. Even though Otis played most of his own parts in the studio, the lineup on this album was quite extensive, including keyboardist George Duke and Aynsley Dunbar of Frank Zappa, Journey and Whitesnake fame.

In 1974, Otis released Inspiration Information, his third and final album for Epic Records. The album had taken almost three years to finish. All the songs were written and arranged by Otis himself, who played every musical instrument on the album, except for horns and some strings. Inspiration Information had but one single (the title track) reach the Billboard Hot 100. After the album's release, Otis was approached by Billy Preston on behalf of The Rolling Stones, asking him to join the band for their upcoming world tour. He declined the offer, along with the chance to work with Quincy Jones in helping produce Otis's next album. After a series of similar refusals, Otis gained the reputation of "taking his time", and his recording contract with Epic Records was nullified. Otis's only credited works throughout the mid-1970s were done as a session musician for his father's recording projects.

Inspiration Information gained a cult following during the 1990s with the emergence of rare groove and acid jazz. It was lauded by such musicians as Prince and Lenny Kravitz. Due in part to this regained interest, the album was re-released on April 3, 2001, by David Byrne's independent label Luaka Bop Records. This CD re-issue includes all nine original album tracks plus four songs taken from Otis' 1971 album Freedom Flight, and features new cover art, liner notes, and exclusive never-seen-before photos.

Otis is featured in every one of his father Johnny's books, as well as Alligator Records Presents West Coast Blues, issued in August 1998.

Otis and Sony Music Entertainment made a deal for a double CD which was released on April 20, 2013. It is a re-release of Inspiration/Information. Added to the album are several bonus tracks, including an accompanying album entitled Wings of Love. Wings of Love is an album of previously unreleased material, all of which was written from 1975 to the present, including live material from some of his performances. It will be available on Shugiterius records (Otis's company) and Sony records, through Sony Music Entertainment.

Otis and a band entitled Shuggie Otis Rite toured internationally in 2013 in support of the release, including Australia, Japan, the U.S., Ireland and the U.K. Their performances earned rave reviews from critics.

A new, mostly instrumental, album was released in April 2018 titled Inter-Fusion.

Personal life
Otis had a son named Johnny III, known as Lucky Otis, with his first wife Miss Mercy of The GTOs, an all-girl group produced by Frank Zappa. Soon after his first marriage ended, he married Lillian Wilson (known as Teri), daughter of trumpeter/bandleader/Latin-jazz pioneer Gerald Wilson; they had a son, Eric, naming him after Eric Dolphy, who was one of Gerald's bandmates and close friends.

Both of Shuggie's sons, Lucky and Eric, are musicians. Eric has played and toured in his father's band. Lucky, a bassist, began by playing with his grandfather, Johnny Otis, and then launched a solo career, heading his own group Otis Ledbetter with partner Louis Ledbetter, great-grandson of blues musician Lead Belly. He has also fronted a 13-piece rhythm-and-blues orchestra, The New Johnny Otis All-Stars, continuing his grandfather's Big Band legacy.

Discography

Studio albums
Here Comes Shuggie Otis (1970), Epic
Freedom Flight (1971), Epic
Inspiration Information (1974), Epic
Inter-Fusion (2018), Cleopatra

Collaborations
With The Johnny Otis Show
Cold Shot! (1968), Kent Records
Snatch & The Poontangs (1969), Kent Records
Cuttin' Up (1970), Epic Records
The Johnny Otis Show Live at Monterey! (1970), Epic Records
The New Johnny Otis Show with Shuggie Otis (1981), Alligator Records
Into the Eighties (1984), Charly Records

With Bo Diddley
Where It All Began (1972), Chess Records
With Al Kooper
Kooper Session (1969), Columbia Records
With Preston Love
Preston Love's Omaha-Bar-B-Q (1969), Kent Records
With Guitar Slim Green
Stone Down Blues (1970), Kent Records
With Gerald Wilson
 Lomelin (1981) Discovery Records
With Frank Zappa
Peaches en Regalia from the album Hot Rats (1969)
With Jimmy Vivino
Violet In Blue from the album Novemberin' (2008)
With Mark Lotito
Novemberin' from the album Novemberin' (2008)

Compilations
Shuggie's Boogie: Shuggie Otis Plays The Blues (1994), Epic Records / Legacy Recordings
World Psychedelic Classics 2: California Soul: Inspiration Information (2001) (Rework and reissue of Shuggie Otis’ 1974 album Inspiration Information), Luaka Bop Records
In Session: Great Rhythm & Blues (2002), Golden Lane Records
Original Album Classics: Shuggie Otis (2013), Epic Records / Legacy Recordings
Wings of Love (2013), Sony Records / Legacy Recordings

Later samples
"Island Letter" sampled by Digable Planets for the track "For Corners" from the album Blowout Comb (1994).
"Strawberry Letter 23" sampled by DJ Quik for the track "Dollaz + Sense" from the album Safe + Sound (1995).
"Aht Uh Mi Hed" sampled by Beginner (band) for the track "Liebes Lied" from the album Bambule (1998).
"Strawberry Letter 23" sampled by OutKast for the track "Ms. Jackson" from the album Stankonia (2001).
"Strawberry Letter 23" sampled by Beyoncé for the track "Be With You" from the album Dangerously in Love (2003).
"Rainy Day" sampled by Beyoncé for the track "Gift from Virgo" from the album Dangerously In Love (2003).
"Oxford Gray" sampled by RJD2 for the track "Ring Finger" from the album Since We Last Spoke (2004).
"Not Available" sampled by J Dilla for the track "Donuts (Outro)" and "Welcome to the Show" from the album Donuts (2006).
"Sweet Thang" sampled by Criolo for the track "Demorô" from the album "Ainda Há Tempo" (2006).
"Oxford Gray" sampled by Alchemist for the track "B.I.G T.W.I.N.S" from the album The Grimey Collection (2008).
"Aht Uh mi Hed" sampled by Kapu (Venezuelan producer) for the track "Uno por ellas" from the album "Apa y Can" (2013).

References

External links
Shuggie Otis' official website 
Shuggie Otis Biography on the Luaka Bop website

Shuggie Otis Interview for Echoes Magazine 2012 - requires Google login
The Mystery of Shuggie Otis by The Village Voice
A concert review on Quooklynite

1953 births
Living people
African-American guitarists
20th-century African-American male singers
American male pianists
African-American drummers
American multi-instrumentalists
Record producers from California
American soul guitarists
American male bass guitarists
American soul singers
People from Sonoma County, California
Soul drummers
Singer-songwriters from California
American people of Greek descent
American musicians of Filipino descent
Guitarists from Los Angeles
20th-century American drummers
American male drummers
20th-century American bass guitarists
20th-century American pianists
21st-century American pianists
20th-century American male musicians
21st-century American male musicians
African-American songwriters
African-American pianists
21st-century African-American musicians
American male singer-songwriters